Municipal Stadium of Kastoria is a multi-use stadium in Kastoria, Greece. It is currently used mostly for football matches and has a capacity of 8,000 seats.

References 
 Στάδιο Καστοριάς

Football venues in Greece
Kastoria